is a video game "without a genre" developed by Level-5 for the Nintendo 3DS, PlayStation Vita, and PlayStation Portable. A demo of the game was included with the release of Level-5's Nintendo 3DS eShop title, Guild01. The game's mystery-themed narrative was penned by Jiro Ishii, who previously directed Chunsoft's acclaimed 2008 visual novel 428: Shibuya Scramble, as well as the 1987 cyberpunk adventure game Imitation City.

Gameplay 
Time Travelers is a cinematic interactive drama game with multiple choices. Usually, if a main character makes a mistake or dies, they can reverse time to perform the right action. Their choices will be displayed in the flowchart. The right choices are necessary to advance the story. A final choice determines which ending the player gets. The game has quick time events, in which players must perform actions by quickly pressing the right button.

Both Nintendo 3DS and PlayStation Vita version can be played using either the touch screen or buttons, while the PlayStation Portable version lacks the touch screen functionality. The Vita version features higher fidelity graphics and larger resolution.

Plot 

In 2013, a mysterious hole, called "Lost Hole", emerged from the sky, and along with it, came an enormous explosion that devastated the central Tokyo area and claimed the lives of many. Eighteen years later on April 28, 2031, in a newly rebuilt metropolis, a new event is about to occur, one that could change the fate of the world forever.

The game takes place in a rebuilt central Tokyo. Technology has greatly advanced since the event that took place eighteen years ago, evident by the holographic signs that fill the streets. A building called "Space Elevator" can be seen rising from Tokyo Bay, with the height of two thousand meters above the city. This particular building is what powers the city, although exactly how it is able to generate energy is a mystery.

Mikoto Shindo, a teenage girl who has time travel ability, must gather the fellow time travelers to prevent a second "Lost Hole" disaster and also to stop a terrorist group named "Mysterious Skull".

Music 
The music for Time Travelers was composed, arranged, and produced by Hideki Sakamoto.

Reception 
Famitsu gave the game a score of 36 out of 40, including a score of 9 out of 10 from each of the four reviewers.

References

External links 
 

2012 video games
Japan-exclusive video games
Level-5 (company) games
Nintendo 3DS games
Nintendo 3DS eShop games
PlayStation Vita games
PlayStation Portable games
Video games about time travel
Video games developed in Japan
Video games featuring female protagonists
Video games scored by Hideki Sakamoto
Video games set in 2013
Video games set in 2031
Video games set in Tokyo